Saul Adler FRS (May 17, 1895 – January 25, 1966) was an Israeli expert on parasitology.

Early life
Adler was born in 1895 in Kerelits (Karelichy), then in the Russian Empire, now in Belarus. In 1900, he and his family moved to England and they settled in Leeds. He studied at University of Leeds and the Liverpool School of Tropical Medicine.

One of his brothers was Solomon Adler, the economist.

Career

From 1917 until 1920, Adler served in the Royal Army Medical Corps, attaining the rank of captain, serving in the Middle East, where he developed his first taste into research into tropical medicine, which he commenced studying after his military service, initially in Liverpool. In 1921, Adler went to Sierra Leone to conduct research into Malaria.

In 1924, Chaim Weizmann offered him a job in Jerusalem to develop the new Institute of Microbiology. Later that year, he emigrated to Mandate Palestine and started working in Hadassah Hospital, becoming director of the department of parasitology in 1927. In 1924, he became Assistant Professor of the Department of Parasitology at the Hebrew University of Jerusalem, serving as Professor from 1928 to 1955.

In 1930, in conjunction with Israel Aharoni, Adler had three Syrian hamsters brought back from Syria and successfully bred them as laboratory animals. This led to the domestication of the Syrian hamster.

In the 1940s he was a leader in developing a leishmaniasis vaccine using live parasites, a practice widespread in Israel and Russia until the 1980s, when large-scale clinical trials showed that the practice led to long-term skin lesions, exacerbation of psoriasis, and immunosuppression in some people.

Education
 University of Leeds, MB, ChB, Leeds, 1917;
 Liverpool School of Tropical Medicine, DTM, Liverpool, 1920;
 MRCP 1937;
 FRCP 1958.

Honours
 In 1933, Chalmers Medal of the Royal Society of Tropical Medicine and Hygiene (London).
 In 1944, elected Chairman of Free Faculty of Medicine of the Hebrew University of Jerusalem.
 In 1947, received Order of the British Empire (OBE)
 In 1957, awarded the Israel Prize, for medicine.
 In 1957, elected Fellow of the Royal Society (London). He was the first Israeli citizen to be elected.
 In 1965, awarded Honorary doctorate from the University of Leeds.
 In 1966, received the Solomon Bublick Award of the Hebrew University of Jerusalem.
 Awarded the Order of the Phoenix, (Greece).
 He also received the Tchernichovsky Prize for exemplary translation, for his translation of The Origin of Species by Charles Darwin.

Achievements
He helped find the cure for malaria.
A street in Jerusalem is named after him.
A room in the Hebrew University of Jerusalem was built in his honour.
His portrait appeared on a stamp in Israel in 1995.
He proposed that Charles Darwin's 'mystery illness' was Chagas Disease (American trypanosomiasis). Although this diagnosis has now been disproved, this proposal did much to excite interest in Darwin's chronic ill health.

Death
Saul Adler died in Jerusalem on 25 January 1966. His funeral was attended by the President of Israel.

Published works
 In 1925, he published Sand Flies to Man, a book on the Transmission of Leishmaniasis.
 In 1960, he translated Charles Darwin's The Origin of Species into Hebrew.

References

External links
 Eva Telkes: Dictionnaire biographique de la première génération de professeurs de l’Université hébraïque de Jérusalem / Biographical Dictionary of the First Generation of Professors at the Hebrew University of Jerusalem Bulletin du Centre de recherche français de Jérusalem 2.1998 (Sample entry: "Shaul" Adler).

1895 births
1966 deaths
British emigrants to Mandatory Palestine
Medical doctors from Leeds
English people of Belarusian-Jewish descent
Fellows of the Royal College of Physicians
Fellows of the Royal Society
Israel Prize in medicine recipients
Officers of the Order of the British Empire
Recipients of the Order of the Phoenix (Greece)
Israeli Jews
Jewish British scientists
Jews in Mandatory Palestine
People from Karelichy
Royal Army Medical Corps officers
Jewish physicians
Israeli microbiologists
Jewish microbiologists
Emigrants from the Russian Empire to the United Kingdom
Members of the Israel Academy of Sciences and Humanities
Jews from the Russian Empire
Solomon Bublick Award recipients
British Army personnel of World War I